Juan Lloret Llorens (born 1952 in Valencia, Spain) is a Spanish politician for the Spanish Socialist Workers' Party (PSOE).

In his University days, Lloret was a member of the Black Flag (Bandera Negra), an anarchist organisation. After qualifying in law, he joined the PSOE in 1975, becoming a committee member the committee for the Valencian Community. He served as a councillor on Valencia City Council from 1983 to 1986, when he was elected to the Spanish Congress of Deputies representing Valencia Province. He was re-elected in the subsequent elections in 1989 but did not stand in 1993.

References

1952 births
Living people
People from Valencia
Members of the 3rd Congress of Deputies (Spain)
Members of the 4th Congress of Deputies (Spain)
Politicians from the Valencian Community
Spanish Socialist Workers' Party politicians